Yuri Aleksandrovich Tsitsinov (August 24, 1937 – August 18, 1994) was an ice hockey player who played in the Soviet Hockey League. He played for HK Lokomotiv Moscow and Krylya Sovetov Moscow. He was inducted into the Russian and Soviet Hockey Hall of Fame in 1991. He was born in Moscow, Soviet Union.

External links
 Yuri Tsitsinov's Russian and Soviet Hockey Hall of Fame bio
 Yuri Tsitsinov's profile at Sports Reference.com
 Yuri Tsitsinov's profile at infosport.ru 

1937 births
1994 deaths
Krylya Sovetov Moscow players
Medalists at the 1960 Winter Olympics
Olympic medalists in ice hockey
Ice hockey people from Moscow
Olympic ice hockey players of the Soviet Union
Olympic bronze medalists for the Soviet Union
Ice hockey players at the 1960 Winter Olympics